Great Escape Theatres was a movie-theatre chain that operated movie theatres primarily in the Midwestern United States. The chain had its headquarters in New Albany, Indiana, located just across the Ohio River from Louisville, Kentucky. In November 2012, Alliance Entertainment (parent company of Great Escape) sold its movie theatre portfolio (except for the Princess 4 in Oxford, Ohio) to Regal Entertainment Group.

Company history

The company was operated by Alliance Entertainment. The first theatre in the chain opened in Bedford, Indiana, in May 1997. The company thereafter opened locations in Indiana,  Kentucky,  Illinois, Ohio, Tennessee, Pennsylvania, West Virginia, Nebraska, Missouri, and Georgia.

A statement on the company's website noted that they focused on mid-size market areas consisting of populations between 100,000 and 400,000 people.

Great Escape Theatres was sold to Regal Cinemas for approximately $91m in December 2012.

The company operated 305 screens at 26 locations. Thirty-eight additional screens were planned for construction in 2009 and 2010. The chain employed a workforce of over 500 people.

The location in Fenton, Missouri, won Best Theater in the St. Louis, Missouri area in the July 2009 issue of St. Louis Magazine.

A location opened in Simpsonville, South Carolina, in early 2010 and Dickson City, Pennsylvania, in late 2010.

Management

The following individuals composed the operating team for Great Escape Theatres.

Anne Ragains-President and CEO
Chance Ragains-Chief Operating Officer
David Poland-VP of Operations
Jamie Bowles-Director of Information Technology
Billy Geltmaker-Operations Administration Manager
Chris Aulisio-Director of Operations - West
Frank Mack-Director of Operations - East
Richard Lintker-Area Manager - Midwest

Customer perks

Great Escape Theatres offers such customer service benefits as online ticket purchase and free concession refills on all large sizes.

Great Escape Theatres also offers an incentive program known as the Critics Choice card.  The Critics Choice card is a loyalty card program that allowed members to earn points towards free concessions and other items.

Theatre locations

References

Defunct companies based in Indiana
Former cinemas in the United States
Economy of the Midwestern United States
Economy of the Southeastern United States
Movie theatre chains in the United States
Regal Entertainment Group